The Kentucky Mr. Football Award is an honor given to the top high school football player in the state of Kentucky and in the KHSAA. Awarded by a panel of sports writers and broadcasters from around the state's Associated Press, many past winners have proceeded to have successful college careers and even play in the National Football League (NFL).

Award winners

Schools with multiple winners

Colleges with multiple winners

References

See also
 List of Kentucky Mr. Basketball award winners

High school football in Kentucky
Mr. Football awards
1986 establishments in Kentucky